was a governor of Ehime Prefecture. He was first elected in 1999 and held the position until he was defeated by Tokihiro Nakamura in 2010. A native of Yawatahama, Ehime and graduate of the University of Tokyo, he joined the Ministry of Education in 1957. He died on 21 March 2020, aged 85.

References

External links 
 Official website 

1934 births
2020 deaths
Politicians from Dalian
Politicians from Ehime Prefecture
People from Yawatahama, Ehime
University of Tokyo alumni
Governors of Ehime Prefecture